The Nashville Sounds Minor League Baseball team has played in Nashville, Tennessee, since being established in 1978 as an expansion team of the Double-A Southern League. They moved up to Triple-A in 1985 as members of the American Association before joining the Pacific Coast League in 1998. With the restructuring of the minor leagues in 2021, they were placed in the Triple-A East, which became the International League in 2022. The first game of the new baseball season for a team is played on Opening Day, and being named the Opening Day starting pitcher is an honor which is given to the player who is expected to lead the pitching staff that season, though there are various strategic reasons why a team's best pitcher might not start on Opening Day. The Sounds have used 41 different Opening Day starters in their 45 seasons.

Nashville's first Opening Day game was played against the Memphis Chicks at Tim McCarver Stadium in Memphis, Tennessee, on April 15, 1978. Bill Dawley was their starting pitcher that day; he took the decision in a game the Sounds lost, 4–2. Their first Opening Day game held at home was an 8–7 win against the Birmingham Barons at Herschel Greer Stadium on April 9, 1981. Starter Jamie Werly, who went on to win the Southern League Most Outstanding Pitcher Award that season, did not figure in the decision. 

On April 4, 2013, starter Tyler Thornburg took a no decision in the final Opening Day game at Greer Stadium, a 5–4 Sounds win. The team left Greer after the 2014 season, but did not play their first Opening Day game at First Horizon Park, their new facility then known as First Tennessee Park, until two years later. In that game, held on April 7, 2016, Sounds starting pitcher Chris Smith was charged with the loss in a 5–0 shutout by the Oklahoma City Dodgers. The 2020 Opening Day game, scheduled to be played at First Horizon Park on April 9, was postponed and ultimately cancelled due to the COVID-19 pandemic.

Nashville's Opening Day starting pitchers have a combined Opening Day record of 11 wins, 15 losses, and 18 no decisions. At Greer Stadium, they had a record of 5 wins, 4 losses, and 8 no decisions in 17 Opening Day starts. At First Horizon Park, they have 0 wins, 2 losses, and 1 no decision in 3 Opening Day starts. They have an aggregate record of 5 wins, 6 losses, and 9 no decisions in 20 Opening Day starts at home. Nashville starters have a record of 6 wins, 9 losses, and 9 no decisions in 24 Opening Day starts on the road.

The only Sounds pitchers with more than one Opening Day start are Bill Dawley (1978 and 1979), Rodney Imes (1990 and 1991), and Zach Jackson (2007 and 2008), each with two starts. Three Sounds Opening Day starters have also started Opening Day games in Major League Baseball: Bob Milacki for the Baltimore Orioles in 1990, Wily Peralta for the Milwaukee Brewers in 2016, and Chris Bassitt for the Oakland Athletics in 2021.

Pitchers

References

Opening Day starting pitchers